The Lonely Trail is a 1936 American Western film starring John Wayne and Ann Rutherford.

Plot
Though he fought for the North in the Civil War, John is asked by the Governor of Texas to get rid of some troublesome carpetbaggers. He enlists the help of Holden before learning that Holden too is plundering the local folk.

Cast

 John Wayne as Captain John Ashley
 Ann Rutherford as Virginia Terry
 Cy Kendall as Adjutant General Benedict Holden
 Bob Kortman as Captain Hays
 Fred "Snowflake" Toones as Snowflake
 Sam Flint as Governor of Texas
 Dennis Moore as Dick Terry
 Jim Toney as Trooper Jed Calicutt
 Etta McDaniel as Mammy
 Yakima Canutt as Trooper Bull Horrell
 Lloyd Ingraham as Tucker (bookkeeper)
 James A. Marcus as Mayor
 Bob Burns as Rancher Jeff Pruitt
 Rodney Hildebrand as Cavalry captain
 Eugene Jackson as Harmonica player/dancer

Crtical reception
Writing for Jacobin in 2015, Eileen Jones criticized the film for promoting the Lost Cause of the Confederacy.

See also
 John Wayne filmography

References

External links
 

1936 films
1936 Western (genre) films
American Western (genre) films
American black-and-white films
Films directed by Joseph Kane
Films with screenplays by Bernard McConville
Lost Cause of the Confederacy
Republic Pictures films
1930s English-language films
1930s American films